Kakai may refer to:
 Kaka'i, also called Yarsan or Ahl-e Haqq, followers of Yarsanism, a religion of Iran and Iraq
 Neferirkare Kakai, pharaoh of Egypt during the fifth dynasty

People with the name
 Kakai Kilonzo, musician from Kenya
 Kakai Khan, Afghan Guantanamo detainee
 Kakai Kissinger, Kenyan human rights activist

See also
 Cacai Bautista, musician from the Philippines